Dernford Fen is a  biological Site of Special Scientific Interest north-west of Sawston in Cambridgeshire.

The site is a rare surviving example of rough fen and carr. Other habitats are dry grassland and scrub, together with ditches and a chalk stream. There are breeding warblers, and the diverse habitats are valuable for amphibians and reptiles.

The site is private land with no public access.

References

Sites of Special Scientific Interest in Cambridgeshire
Sawston